FiLiA is a British radical feminist organisation established in 2013 to promote sex-based rights. Described by critics as anti-transgender, FiLiA asserts that a conflict exists between "transgenderism" and "sex-based rights". It hosts an annual conference, which claims to be the largest of its kind. One of its key figures is Heather Brunskell-Evans, the founder of Women's Declaration International (WDI). It is known for its opposition to transgender rights and is described by The Daily Dot as "openly transphobic" and "opposing the idea that you can even be trans". 

The organisation has faced accusations of transphobia and protests against its events, including from local authorities. The Trans Safety Network described the FiLiA conference as characterised by "a disturbing trend of anti-trans extremism, conspiracy theory and harassment of trans and GNC people" and said that "much of the content on their website indicates a hostility to trans women [and] conspiratorial beliefs," noting that the group has promoted George Soros conspiracy theories. FiLiA has claimed that the organisation was banned from Labour Party and Liberal Democrat conferences. FiLiA has also accused "Antifa" of being behind claims that "FiLiA are a hate group masquerading as a feminist charity."

In 2020 cosmetics company Lush apologised for donating money to FiLiA and other anti-trans groups, after the company had faced extensive criticism, e.g. from the leader of Young Labour, Jessica Barnard, who said it was "disgusting to see Lush funding transphobia."

In 2022, the National Education Union executive passed a motion that described FiLiA as a transphobic organisation. In 2022, FiLiA also organised a conference in Cardiff where, among other things, the alleged threat of "trans ideology" was discussed. The conference featured several speakers known for anti-trans views, including Maya Forstater, Helen Joyce, Julie Bindel, Rosie Duffield and Sheila Jeffreys. Ahead of the conference, organisations across Cardiff signed a statement of support for all women and girls, both transgender and cisgender. Many businesses in Cardiff responded by flying the trans flag to condemn the FiLiA event. During the 2022 conference, some FiLiA participants tried to enter local businesses to complain about trans flags or complain about the presence of trans people, while two FiLiA participants were arrested for harassing trans people. Labour Students described FiLiA as "an anti-trans lobbying group" and said Rosie Duffield's behaviour "has gone beyond the pale and we echo LGBT+ Labour's calls that she should lose the Labour whip" after she attended the FiLiA conference, calling upon the party to "adopt a definition of transphobia [and] deal with instances of transphobia more efficiently".

References

Organisations that oppose transgender rights in the United Kingdom
Advocacy groups in the United Kingdom
2013 establishments in England